Trip is the sixth studio album by Japanese singer and songwriter Rina Aiuchi. It was released on May 31, 2008, through Giza Studio, almost two years after the fifth studio album Delight. This is the first album in which Rina is the main producer. The album consists of four previous released singles, such as Bara ga Saku Bara ga Chiru (薔薇が咲く 薔薇が散る), Mint, Nemurenu Yo ni/Party Time Party Up (眠れぬ夜に／PARTY TIME PARTY UP) and I believe you ~Ai no Hana~ (I believe you 〜愛の花〜). A special website was launched to promote the album which includes self liner notes and preview tracks.

This album is released in two formats: regular CD version (GZCA-5131) and limited CD+DVD version (GZCA-5130). In DVD are included clips and interview from "Rina Aiuchi R-Live vol.4".

The album charted at #10 on the Oricon charts in its first week. It charted for five weeks and sold more than 28,000 copies.

Track listing

In media
Trip - theme song for Nihon TV program Shiodome Event Bu
I believe you ~Ai no Hana~ - theme song for Tokyo Broadcasting System Television program Koisuru Hami Kami!
Min - ending theme for Nihon TV program Super Chample
Bara ga Saku Bara ga Chiru - opening theme for Anime television series Fist of the Blue Sky
Nemureni Yoru ni - ending theme for Tokyo Broadcasting System Television program Kamisamaa~zu

References

2008 albums
Being Inc. albums
Japanese-language albums
Giza Studio albums